Richard See (1935–2018) was a rugby league footballer who competed in the Australian New South Wales Rugby League premiership (NSWRL).

Rugby League career
A long serving Lock forward, See played for Eastern Suburbs in one of the bleakest periods of the club's existence.

See played for Easts between 1956 and 1963, in those years the club only made the semis on one occasion.  Eastern Suburbs went all the way to the grand final in 1960, only to be defeated by St George 31–6.

See also spent one season playing for the Newtown club in 1964.

Water Polo career
Dick See played for the Bronte Water Polo club in the Sydney first grade competition. He played alongside the Thornett brothers and won the Sydney first grade competition in the 1958/59, 1959/60, 1960/61, 1961/62, and 1970/71 seasons.

See’s greatest individual accolade was representing NSW at the 1956 Australian championships.

See played water polo against Easts teammate Bill Roney. Roney represented the Bondi Water Polo club throughout his career.

References

External links
The Encyclopedia of Rugby League players - Alan Whiticker & Glen Hudson

1935 births
2018 deaths
Australian rugby league players
Sydney Roosters players
Newtown Jets players
Rugby league locks
Rugby league second-rows
Rugby league players from Sydney